Motoaki (written: 基昭 or 基朗) is a masculine Japanese given name. Notable people with the name include:

, Japanese footballer
, Japanese composer
Motoaki Tanigo (谷御 元昭), founder and CEO of COVER Corporation, parent company of Hololive Production

Japanese masculine given names